Victor Bernau (14 January 1890 – 13 May 1939) was a Norwegian singer, actor and theatre director. He was artistical director at Chat Noir, Scala Teater and Det Nye Teater. He is often regarded as the founder of Norwegian revue.

References

1890 births
1939 deaths
Male actors from Oslo
Norwegian theatre directors
Norwegian male stage actors
20th-century Norwegian male singers
20th-century Norwegian singers